Sambia Sexual Culture: Essays from the Field is a 1999 book about the Simbari people and their sexual practices by the anthropologist Gilbert Herdt. The book received negative reviews, accusing Herdt of being biased in his approach and his conclusions. In the book the Simbari people are called Sambia people

Summary

Herdt discusses the culture of the Simbari people. His work is influenced by the philosopher Michel Foucault.

Publication history
Sambia Sexual Culture was first published in 1999 by the University of Chicago Press.

Reception
Sambia Sexual Culture received a mixed review from Glenn Petersen in Library Journal, and negative reviews from the anthropologist Jadran Mimica in the Australian Journal of Anthropology and the philosopher James Giles in the Archives of Sexual Behavior. The book was also reviewed by Alexandra A. Brewis in American Anthropologist, Andrew P. Lyons in Anthropologica, and Paul Sillitoe in the Journal of the Royal Anthropological Institute, and discussed by Nathaniel McConaghy in the Archives of Sexual Behavior.

Petersen credited Herdt with providing "a good deal of theoretical discussion of sexual identity in a cross-cultural framework", and with taking "great care to relativize the homosexual aspects" of the Simbari's ritual practices. However, he criticized Herdt for providing little "commentary on the matter of elders taking sexual advantage of children", noting that the issue was "a topic of considerable immediacy in contemporary America."

Mimica considered Herdt's approach to Simbari culture biased. Though she complimented his discussions of topics such as the use of secret flutes in "Simbari man-making practices", the practice of nose-bleeding, "male fears of semen depletion", and "Simbari semen transactions", she found other parts of his work flawed, writing that while they contained interesting information, they were "limited by a naive mechanistic-functionalist conceptual framework dependent on uncritically accepted differentiations between 'biological', 'psychological', 'symbolic', 'cultural' and 'social' levels of human existence and ... such pseudo-Aristotelian notions as 'ultimate' and 'proximate' causes". She accused him of "prevarications and exaggerations about his methodology and data", and found his ideas about the Simbari incompletely worked out. She criticized his failure to make a systematic study of the Simbari language or to properly discuss this failure, and argued that despite his use of psychoanalysis and the influence of Foucault on his work, his framework was nevertheless basically "positivist". She considered him incorrect to describe Simbari culture in terms of categories such as the sacred, the profane, and the supernatural. She concluded that his book was "yet another volume in yet another series on the increasingly sterilised and sterilising academic topics of sexuality, gender, and culture."

Giles argued that Herdt's view that Simbari boys give up their homosexual desires and acquire heterosexual desires when they become young men conflicts with the conclusion, supported by Alan P. Bell, Martin S. Weinberg, and Sue Kiefer Hammersmith in Sexual Preference (1981) and John C. Gonsiorek and James D. Weinrich in Homosexuality: Research implications for public health policy (1991), that sexual orientation is set in early childhood. He questioned Herdt's view that Simbari culture determined the sexual desires of Simbari males, and accused Herdt of bias. He criticized Herdt for ignoring nonsexual desires that might motivate Simbari sexual behavior. He argued that the Simbari's sexual rituals are coercive, and that this should "make us suspicious of claims that the homosexual activities performed during or as a result of the ritual in any way reflect the participant’s real sexual desires." He criticized Herdt's argument that the "bawdy enthusiasm" showed by Simbari boys who participate in the rituals shows that their behavior is motivated by erotic desire, noting that "child victims of adult or adolescent sexual abuse are often willing, and even enthusiastic, participants in the sexual acts that they are manipulated into performing". Though finding Sambia Sexual Culture fascinating, he concluded that Herdt failed to support his main conclusions about Simbari sexual culture.

McConaghy criticized Giles for assuming that people are either heterosexual or gay and ignoring the existence of people with both heterosexual and homosexual desires. However, he agreed with Giles that the homosexual behavior of many of the boys may not have been motivated by sexual desire, as well as his criticism of Herdt's idea that culture can implant sexual desires through deep scripting. McConaghy further stated that the distribution of homosexual feelings could be the same in both Simbari and Western culture.

References

Bibliography
Books

 

Journals

  
  
  
  
  
  
  

1999 non-fiction books
American non-fiction books
Anthropology books
Books by Gilbert Herdt
English-language books
Non-fiction books about sexuality
University of Chicago Press books